YR Gaitonde Centre for AIDS Research and Education (YRG Care) is a non-profit organisation in India working in the domain of HIV/AIDS. The organisation was founded by Suniti Solomon in 1993. As reported in 2018, YRG Care had provided HIV prevention and treatment related services to about 21,000 people in India who were infected by HIV. After Suniti Solomon died, Sunil Solomon leads YRG Care.


History 
Seeing the challenges to fight against HIV, Suniti Solomon founded YRG Care with limited staff and resources. The organisation started from three people and provided basic testing facilities. Dr Suniti Solomon started spreading awareness with school children, community gatherings and other civic groups. She would rent a room in a lodge if space was required. Later, her friends started to give her space for care in their houses. YRG Care then rented a floor in Raman Street in Chennai. Suniti was later able to use a disused building in Voluntary Health Services (VHS) hospital campus.

YRG Care now conducts behavioural and medical research and provides care and support to people living with HIV/AIDS. There are More than 50 original articles that have been published in various peer-reviewed medical journals basis the studies undertaken at YRG Care.

YRG Care ID Lab 
Established in 2000, the Infectious Diseases (ID) laboratory of YRG care is housed at VHS Hospital campus in Chennai. The lab is in collaboration with the Johns Hopkins University, Brown University and is supported by a grant from the National Institutes of Health. The lab conducts biomedical research in the fields of the basic sciences.

References 

HIV/AIDS in India
HIV/AIDS organizations
HIV/AIDS activism
Medical and health organisations based in India
Public health organizations